Kay-Arne Arvid Wiestål (16 October 1940 – 14 November 2020) was a Swedish footballer and entrepreneur.

Career
Wiestål played for Djurgårdens IF and won Allsvenskan in 1966. He later played in the North American Soccer League for Oakland Clippers and St. Louis Stars. In 1970, he joined Ope IF as playing manager.

Death 
Kay Wiestål died on 14 November 2020, at the age of 80, from COVID-19.

Honours

Club 

 Djurgårdens IF 
 Allsvenskan: 1966

References

Swedish footballers
Swedish football managers
Allsvenskan players
Djurgårdens IF Fotboll players
Oakland Clippers players
St. Louis Stars (soccer) players
Kalmar FF managers
1940 births
2020 deaths
North American Soccer League (1968–1984) players
Association footballers not categorized by position
Swedish expatriate footballers
Expatriate soccer players in the United States
Swedish expatriate sportspeople in the United States
Deaths from the COVID-19 pandemic in Sweden